The discography of the English rock band the Cribs consists of eight studio albums, one compilation album, thirty five singles, one EP, and twenty seven music videos. The Cribs was formed in 2001 by twins Gary and Ryan Jarman and their younger brother Ross Jarman. The band signed to Wichita Recordings in 2003 and released the singles the following year; "Another Number", "You Were Always the One" and "What About Me" from their debut album The Cribs which released in March 2004. The latter two singles reached the Official UK Singles Chart Top 100.

The Cribs  released their second studio album The New Fellas in July 2005. Despite having leaked onto internet file sharing sites and message boards, it was more successful than their debut album, charting at #78 on the UK Albums Chart, this would be their first entry on the chart.  The album produced three singles, "Hey Scenesters!", "Mirror Kissers" and "Martell" all of which reached the top 40 of the UK Singles Chart, another first for the band.

The band's third studio album Men's Needs, Women's Needs, Whatever was released in May 2007. The album performed even better than the last, reaching #13 in the UK and also charting on the Scottish Albums Chart as well as the Irish Albums Chart. The album also spawned the band's most popular single "Men's Needs" which reached #17 in the UK, and also charted in various other countries charts. Singles "Moving Pictures" and "Don't You Wanna Be Relevant? / Our Bovine Public" also reached the top 40 in UK, completing a run of 7 consecutive Top 40 singles for the band.

The Cribs following albums; Ignore the Ignorant, In the Belly of the Brazen Bull, For All My Sisters and 24-7 Rock Star Shit would all reach the top 10 in UK. The band's eight studio album Night Network was the first since 2009's Ignore the Ignorant to not reach the UK top 10, peaking at number 19.

In 2022, the band re-released their first three albums, which all reached the UK Album Chart, charting against the likes of Beyoncé. All three albums topped their previous charting positions including the band's debut which never reached the charts upon release. On August 5, 2022, The Cribs became the first band to chart 3 studio albums in the Official Scottish Albums Chart simultaneously.

Albums

Studio albums

Compilation albums

Extended plays

Singles

Promotional singles

Split singles

Other charted songs

Music videos

Notes

References 

Rock music group discographies
Discographies of British artists